Connor Tobin (born February 11, 1987) is an American soccer player.

Career

College
Tobin was born in Fort Collins, Colorado. He attended the University of Vermont where he was a standout player for the Catamounts.  He played in 77 games during his collegiate career ending with 12 points on four goals and four assists.

During his college career Tobin received numerous accolades. He was named to the America East All-Rookie Team and America East Commissioners Academic Honor Roll as a freshman in 2005; was named to the America East All-Conference Second Team, the America East All-Academic Team, the America East All-Championship Team and the America East Commissioners Academic Honor Roll as a sophomore in 2006; was the America East Men's Soccer Scholar-Athlete of the Year and was named to the America East All-Conference First Team, the America East All-Championship Team, the America East All-Academic Team, the NSCAA All-Northeast Region Third Team, the ESPN The Magazine Academic All-District I Second Team and the America East Commissioners Academic Honor Roll as a sophomore in 2007; and was named to the 2008-09 America East Academic Honor Roll, the ESPN The Magazine Academic All-America First Team, the America East All-Conference First Team, the NSCAA All-Northeast District Second Team, the ESPN The Magazine Academic All-District I First Team, the America East All-Academic Team, the NSCAA Scholar All-America Second Team, the NSCAA Scholar All-East Region First Team as a senior in 2008, as well as being a candidate for the Lowe's Senior CLASS Award and the 2008 America East Defender of the Year.

Professional
Having trained with English club Sheffield United during the spring of 2008, Tobin signed a one-year contract with Norwegian club with Nybergsund on February 16, 2009, after a two-week trial period in which he started in the team's preseason games. He went on to play 19 games for Nybergsund.

Tobin returned to the United States in 2011 and signed with Rochester Rhinos of the USL Professional Division. He played his first game for his new team on April 15, 2011, against Richmond Kickers.

Tobin signed with NASL club Minnesota Stars FC on April 4, 2012.

He moved on to Carolina RailHawks prior to the 2014 season. He made his league debut for the club on April 12, 2014, in a 1-1 away draw with Indy Eleven. He scored his first competitive goal for the club on May 17, 2014, in a 2-0 home victory over Atlanta Silverbacks. His goal, scored in the 36th minute, made the score 2-0 to the RailHawks.

In February 2019, Tobin was signed by USL League One side Forward Madison FC ahead of their inaugural season. He made his league debut for the club on April 6, 2019, in a 1-0 defeat to Chattanooga Red Wolves SC.

Career statistics

Notes

References

External links 
 
 Nybergsund Official Website
 Connor Tobin Bio (University of Vermont Athletics)
 Transatlantic: Men's soccer makes contact in England (Vermont Cynic)
 Vermont's Tobin Signs With Norwegian Pro Soccer Team (University of Vermont Athletics)

1987 births
Living people
American soccer players
American expatriate soccer players
Vermont Catamounts men's soccer players
Nybergsund IL players
Rochester New York FC players
Minnesota United FC (2010–2016) players
North Carolina FC players
Forward Madison FC players
Expatriate footballers in Norway
Norwegian First Division players
USL Championship players
North American Soccer League players
Soccer players from Colorado
Association football defenders
USL League One players
American expatriate sportspeople in Norway
Sportspeople from Fort Collins, Colorado